Pogromni Volcano is a stratovolcano on Unimak Island in the Aleutian Islands. Near it are 5 cinder cones, and a mountain called Pogromni's Sister.

Pogromni is old and eroded with a single glacier on its flank and base. Eruptions have been attributed to it in 1795, 1796, 1826, 1827, and 1830, but historic eruptions attributed to it may have come from nearby Westdahl Volcano.


Etymology 
The volcano's name comes from the Russian "Погромный," meaning "characterized by violent outbreak." This naming refers to a volcanic eruption, but shares the same etymology as pogrom, a Russian word referring to violent riots against an ethnic group, especially Jews.

See also

List of mountain peaks of North America
List of mountain peaks of the United States
List of mountain peaks of Alaska
List of Ultras of the United States
List of volcanoes in the United States

References

External links

http://www.bartleby.com/69/66/P06166.html
http://www.avo.alaska.edu/volcanoes/volcact.php?eruptionid=273&volcname=Westdahl Eruption dates?
http://www.volcano.si.edu/world/volcano.cfm?vnum=1101-34-
Google Earth view

Volcanoes of Aleutians East Borough, Alaska
Stratovolcanoes of the United States
Volcanoes of Alaska
Mountains of Aleutians East Borough, Alaska
Mountains of Alaska
Unimak Island
Pleistocene stratovolcanoes